Muscle Tussle is a 1953 Warner Bros. Merrie Melodies theatrical cartoon short directed by Robert McKimson. The cartoon was released on April 18, 1953 and stars Daffy Duck.

Synopsis
Daffy goes to the beach with his girlfriend Melissa Duck, who bears a strong resemblance to Veronica Lake (voiced by an uncredited Gladys Holland), and prepares to take her picture. While posing, she sees a muscle-bound duck and turns her attention toward him. Daffy gets upset and calls out the muscle-bound duck (a soft-spoken yet still arrogant fellow) for "tryin' to muscle in on [his] chick". He replies that he'll bob Daffy so hard he'll have to open his vest to eat if he says one more word. Daffy takes the threat rather lightly, and the muscle-bound duck proceeds to hit Daffy so hard that his head sinks into his stomach. In a daze, Daffy orders "One cheeseburger, hold the onions". 

Melissa urges Daffy to fight back, but he backs down knowing the size of his opponent. Disgusted by his cowardice, Melissa goes off with the muscle-bound duck and bids Daffy farewell, calling him a "scrawny little nine-pound weakling" which offends Daffy as he considers himself a "scrawny little ten-pound weakling." A glad-handed traveling salesman who happens to be nearby overhears the whole thing and sells Daffy some muscle tonic (actually hot mustard), which he thinks has made him as strong as the muscle-bound duck and just might help him win back his girl. Daffy repeatedly falls short in his attempts to demonstrate his strength, but through a fluke (and one of the salesman's props, a "five thousand-pound" barbell), manages to dispose of his rival in the end. The muscle-bound duck lifts the "barbell" which sends him rocketing thousands of feet into the air. When he plummets back to Earth now squashed from the impact, he tells the couple "You all can call me shorty!", and waddles off. With that, Melissa takes Daffy back saying she likes her man “tall, dark and gruesome”.

Home media
DVD - Trouble Along the Way

Censorship
The ABC version of this cartoon cuts the part where the big, muscular duck pounds Daffy's head into his shirt.

References

External links

 

1953 animated films
1953 short films
1953 films
1950s Warner Bros. animated short films
Merrie Melodies short films
Warner Bros. Cartoons animated short films
Films directed by Robert McKimson
Daffy Duck films
Films scored by Carl Stalling
Films set on beaches
1950s English-language films